The Down Intermediate Football Championship is an annual Gaelic football competition contested by mid-tier Down GAA clubs. The national media covers the competition.

Saval are the title holders (2022) defeating Rostrevor in the Final.

Format
16 clubs compete in the competition.

History
Bredagh won their maiden title in 2016.

The 2022 final between Rostrevor and Saval pitted Benny Coulter and Danny Hughes (teammates when Down got as far as the 2010 All-Ireland Senior Football Championship Final) against each other on the sideline.

Honours
The trophy presented to the winners is the ? The winner of the Down IFC qualifies to play in the Down Senior Football Championship. The Down IFC winner also qualifies for the Ulster Intermediate Club Football Championship. It is the only team from Down to qualify for this competition. The Down IFC winner may enter the Ulster Intermediate Club Football Championship at either the preliminary round or the quarter-final stage. They often do well there, with the likes of Rostrevor among the clubs from Down to play in at least one Ulster Championship final after winning the Down Intermediate Football Championship. Liatroim Fontenoys won Ulster in 1998. Warrenpoint won Ulster in 2014. Then Loughlinisland won Ulster in 2015.

The Down IFC winner — by winning the Ulster Intermediate Club Football Championship — may qualify for the All-Ireland Intermediate Club Football Championship, at which it would enter at the semi-final stage, providing it hasn't been drawn to face the British champions in the quarter-finals.

Finals listed by year

Wins listed by club

References

Down GAA club championships
Intermediate Gaelic football county championships